Lourens Cornelius Adriaanse (born 5 February 1988) is a South African rugby union rugby player who plays as a tighthead prop for  in the South African Currie Cup.

Career
Adriaanse was born in Cape Town and has played in the  youth teams.

Adriaanse joined  on a three-year deal prior to the 2017–18 season.

International
He finally made his Springbok debut in a test against  on 23 November 2013 in Paris.

Personal life

Adriaanse is the younger brother of prop Jacobie Adriaanse.

References

External links 

 Profile at itsrugby.co.uk
Adriaanse at www.genslin.us/bokke

Living people
1988 births
Afrikaner people
South African rugby union players
South Africa international rugby union players
Rugby union props
Griquas (rugby union) players
Cheetahs (rugby union) players
Sharks (rugby union) players
Rugby union players from Cape Town
Alumni of Paarl Gimnasium
Stellenbosch University alumni
Sharks (Currie Cup) players
South African expatriate sportspeople in France
Section Paloise players
Expatriate rugby union players in France
South African expatriate rugby union players